Butser Hill is a hill and nature reserve in Hampshire, England. South-west of Petersfield, it is a  biological and geological Site of Special Scientific Interest. It is a national nature reserve and a Special Area of Conservation. Part of it is a Scheduled Monument.

It is a chalk hill and one of the highest points in Hampshire. It is also the highest point on the chalk ridge of the South Downs and the second highest point in the South Downs National Park after Blackdown in the Western Weald. It is located within the borders of the Queen Elizabeth Country Park.

The name Butser comes from the Old English Bryttes Oran meaning Briht's slope. Oran or Ora is Old English for flat topped hill and/or steep slope.

The flat summit is surrounded by a number of spurs. Iron Age ditches and banks divide the spurs from the summit although the purpose of these earthworks is unclear.

There is evidence of lynchet farming on the southeast side of the hill. The age of the lynchets is unknown but Roman pottery has been brought to the surface by rabbit holes.

There are aerial masts on the hill.

The hill was purchased by Hampshire County Council in 1966. Prior to the purchase the summit was used for growing wheat but now the only farming activity is grazing. In December 2021 a £240,000 program was announced to restore grassland on the hill and improve trails.

Butser Hill has a rich variety of flora and fauna located upon the hill. Butser Hill is in the top twenty Hampshire chalk grassland sites for its rich vascular flora, and is the richest chalk grassland site in Hampshire in terms of its bryophyte (125 species) and lichen (82 species) flora. As well as this, over 30 species of butterfly have been recorded, including populations of Duke of Burgundy and the Silver-spotted Skipper, making the area an important conservation area for many butterfly species.

There is an annual Fell Run called the Butser Hill Challenge that involves running up and down the hill three times.

Miscellaneous 
A spur of Butser Hill known as Little Butser was the original home of the Butser Ancient Farm experimental archaeology project.

Butser Hill has been a primary hang-gliding site since the early-1970s.

The 1986 Only Fools and Horses episode Tea for Three was filmed, in part, at Butser Hill.

See also
Butser Ancient Farm

References

Hills of Hampshire
Marilyns of England
Sites of Special Scientific Interest in Hampshire
Special Areas of Conservation in England
Geological Conservation Review sites